Martin Schoeller (born March 12, 1968) is a New York-based photographer whose style of "hyper-detailed close ups" is distinguished by similar treatment of all subjects whether they are celebrities or unknown. His most recognizable work are his portraits, shot with similar lighting, backdrop, and tone.  His work appears in "National Geographic Magazine", The New Yorker, "New York Times Magazine", Time, GQ, and Vogue. He has been a staff photographer at The New Yorker since 1999.

Early life and education
Born in Munich, Germany on March 12, 1968. In his early years he was influenced by photographers August Sander, Bernd Becher, and Hilla Becher. Schoeller studied photography at Lette-Verein in Berlin.

Career
Schoeller started his career in Germany, and came to New York in 1993 and worked as an assistant for Annie Leibovitz from 1993 to 1996. Here he developed his "big head" portrait technique, a term coined by him, of  his style of "hyper-detailed close ups", which later gave him worldwide acclaim. He left in 1996 to pursue his freelancing career. Soon his street portraits started getting published in Rolling Stone, GQ, Esquire, Entertainment Weekly, and W. In 1999, Schoeller joined Richard Avedon, as a contributing portrait photographer to The New Yorker since then.

Over the years, his large-scale portraits have been exhibited at various museums and galleries worldwide. A book of his portraits was published by teNeues in 2005: "Close Up: Portraits 1998-2005", consisting of 75  tight portraits, put together from over 300 shoots with various celebrities.  Another, "Female Bodybuilders," was published by Pond Press in 2008. Stern published a portfolio of his work, "Fotographie Portfolio #54", also in 2008. His most recent book "Portraits", published in 2014 by teNeues, features a 15-year retrospective of his environmental portraiture. He also launched simultaneous exhibitions in Berlin and New York City featuring the work upon release of the book. His work is in the Permanent Collection of the Smithsonian National Portrait Gallery.

He shot the controversial cover of the May 21, 2012 issue of  Time magazine about attachment parenting.
In his latest book "Identical: Portraits of Twins" again by teNeues he examines 40 sets of identical twins and multiples in his distinctive close-up style.

Personal life
Married to Helen Rutman Schoeller, a graphic designer, in 2000. He currently lives and works in Manhattan, New York.

Honors

 1998-2020 – American Photography Photo Annual
 1999-2015 – Communication Arts Photo Annual
 2019 – Winner, Black Pencil, D&AD awards – Colin Kaepernick, Nike “Just do it” Campaign
 2016 – Finalist, Best Covers, National Magazine Awards: American Society of Magazine Editors – “The Reign of Kevin Hart” The Hollywood Reporter
 2015 – Finalist, Best Covers, National Magazine Awards: American Society of Magazine Editors – “Saint Bill [Murray]” Variety
 2015 – Medal Finalist, Society of Publication Designers – “The Bodies We Want: Travis & Lyn-Z Pastrana” ESPN
 2015 – Medal Finalist, Society of Publication Designers – “Saint Bill [Murray]” Variety
 2014 – Winner, Best Covers, National Magazine Awards: American Society of Magazine Editors – “Michael Douglas is Liberace” New York Magazine
 2014 – Medal Finalist, Society of Publication Designers – “Bloomberg” New York Magazine
 2014 – Merit Winner, Society of Publication Designers – “The Flight Risk” The New York Times Mag.
 2014 – Merit Winner, Society of Publication Designers – “Sonny Rollins, the Colossus” Men's Journal
 2013 – Medal Finalist, Society of Publication Designers – “Tastemakers” Bon Appétit
 2013 – Merit Winner, Society of Publication Designers – “Twins” National Geographic
 2013 – Merit Winner, Society of Publication Designers – “Diane von Furstenberg” Boston Common
 2012 – Best of 2012: National Geographic Magazine Photos of the Year – “Johanna & Eva Gill”
 2012 – Top 10 Photos of 2012, TIME Magazine – “Gabby Douglas”
 2012 – Best Photo Book 2012, American Photo Magazine – “Identical: Portraits of Twins”
 2012 – Gold Medal, Society of Publication Designers – “Zach Galifianakis” GQ
 2012 – Merit Winner, Society of Publication Designers – “Ashrita Furman” The New Yorker
 2012 – Merit Winner, Society of Publication Designers – “TIME 100” TIME Magazine
 2011 – Medal Finalist, Society of Publication Designers – “Rheinmaidens” The New Yorker
 2011 – Merit Winner, Society of Publication Designers – “Marina Abramovic” The New Yorker
 2011 – Merit Winner, Society of Publication Designers – “Marina Abramovic” Stern
 2011 – Merit Winner, Society of Publication Designers – “April Bloomfield” The New Yorker
 2011 – Cover Merit Winner, Society of Publication Designers – “Kobe Bryant” SLAM Magazine
 2001-2010 – Photo District News Photo Annual
 2010 – Winner, Best Covers, American Society of Magazine Editors – “Men of the Year Issue” GQ
 2010 – Finalist, National Magazine Awards: Photo Portfolio, American Society of Magazine Editors – “The Hadza” National Geographic
 2010 – Gold Medal, Society of Publication Designers – “The Hadza” National Geographic
 2010 – Medal Finalist, Society of Publication Designers – “The Actress” The New Yorker
 2010 – Medal Finalist, Society of Publication Designers – “Men of the Year Portfolio” GQ 
 2009 – Best of 2009: National Geographic Magazine Photos of the Year – “Nija”
 2009 – Medal Finalist, Society of Publication Designers – “Marc Jacobs Doesn’t Give a F***” GQ
 2009 – Finalist, National Magazine Awards: Best in Entertainment/Celebrity Covers, American Society of Magazine Editors – “How to Be a Man” Issue Esquire
 2008 – Best Portrait Award, American Photo Images of the Year
 2008 – Finalist, National Magazine Awards: Photojournalism, American Society of Magazine Editors – “The Interpreter” The New Yorker
 2008 – Cover Finalist, Society of Publication Designers – “American Gangster” Entertainment Weekly
 2008 – Medal Finalist, Society of Publication Designers – “George Clooney” Entertainment Weekly
 2008 – Merit Award, Society of Publication Designers – “Chill Will” Premiere Magazine
 2008 – Merit Award: Entire Issue, Society of Publication Designers – GQ
 2006 – Best Celebrity Cover 2nd Place, Magazine Publishers of America – “Steve Carell” Premiere Magazine
 2004 – Gold Medal, Society of Publication Designers – “Tigers of the Snow: Three Generations of Great Climbing Sherpas” Outside Magazine
 2004 – Finalist, National Magazine Awards: Photo Portfolio/Essay, American Society of Magazine Editors – “Tigers of the Snow: Three Generations of Great Climbing Sherpas” Outside Magazine
 2002 – Silver Medal, Society of Publication Designers – “Hip Hop Portfolio” The New Yorker
 2001 – Gold Medal, Society of Publication Designers – “Sports Portfolio” The New Yorker
 2000 – Silver Medal, Society of Publication Designers – “Cheerleaders” Rolling Stone
 2000 – Best New Talent, LIFE Magazine Alfred Eisenstaedt Awards

Solo exhibitions 
 2020 “Close” XPM Photography Museum (Changsha, China)
 2020 “Death Row Exonerees” Fotografiska (New York, NY)
 2020 “Close Up” Camera Work (Berlin, Germany)
 2020 “Works” NRW Forum (Düsseldorf, Germany)
 2020 “Survivors–Faces of Life after the Holocaust” Zeche Zollverein (Essen, Germany)
 2019 “Close”, Shanghai Center of Photography (Shanghai, China)
 2018 “Big Heads” Nederlands Fotomuseum (Rotterdam, Netherlands)
 2015 "Martin Schoeller: Up Close", Fotografiska (Stockholm, Sweden)
 2014 "Portraits", Hasted Kraeutler Gallery (New York, NY)
 2014 "Portraits", CWC Gallery (Berlin, Germany)
 2013 "Close Up", EMP Museum (Seattle, WA)
 2013 "Identical: Portraits of Twins", Ace Gallery (Beverly Hills, CA)
 2013 "Female Bodybuilders", Drew University (Madison, NJ)
 2013 "Close Up", Eastern Illinois University (Charleston, IL)
 2012 "Close Up", Naples Museum of Art (Naples, FL)
 2012 "Close Up", Boca Raton Museum of Art (Boca Raton, Florida)
 2011 "Behind the Mask", Museum the Kennedys (Berlin, Germany)
 2010 "Close Up", National Portrait Gallery (Canberra, Australia)
 2010 "Close Up & Female Bodybuilders", Hasted Hunt Kraeutler Gallery (New York, NY)
 2009 "Martin Schoeller: Portraits", A. galerie (Paris, France)
 2008 "Female Bodybuilders", Ace Gallery (Beverly Hills, CA)
 2008 "Close Up", Hasted Hunt Gallery (New York, NY)
 2007 "Close Up", Ace Gallery (Beverly Hills, CA)
 2007 "Close Up", Bernard Toale Gallery (Boston, MA)
 2007 "Close Up", Griffin Museum of Photography (Winchester, MA)
 2006 "Close Up", Brancolini Grimaldi Contemporary Art (Florence, Italy)
 2006 "Close Up", Galerie Wouter van Leeuwen (Amsterdam, The Netherlands)
 2006 "Close Up", Hasted Hunt Gallery (New York, NY)
 2005 "Close Up", Camera Work (Berlin, Germany)
 2005 "Close Up", Forma Galleria (Milan, Italy)

Noted Projects

 Photographing the Pirahã tribe in northwestern Brazil for The New Yorker 
 Photographing the Hadza tribe in Tanzania for National Geographic 
 Photographing the homeless clients of the Greater West Hollywood Food Coalition and posting the photos exclusively on Instagram to raise awareness of homelessness and support for the volunteer-run non profit.
Photographing 75 Holocaust Survivors in cooperation with the World Holocaust Remembrance Center Yad Vashem in Jerusalem, Israel

Schoeller's photo books

 Works by Steidl (2020)
 Survivors – Faces of Life after the Holocaust by Steidl (2020)
 Close by Steidl (2018)
 Portraits by teNeues (2014)
 Identical: Portraits of Twins (2012)
 Martin Schoeller Stern Portfolio by teNeues (2009)
 Female Bodybuilders (2008)
 Close Up: Portraits 1998-2005 by teNeues (2005)

References

 The Hadza National Geographic

External links
 Martin Schoeller, website
 Martin Schoeller profile and works The New Yorker
 The Changing Face of America

Portrait photographers
Living people
1968 births
Photographers from Munich
German expatriates in the United States
The New Yorker people